Lars Larsen (born 6 December 1970) is a Danish former professional footballer who played as a midfielder.

Career
Larsen was born in Hårslev, Nordfyn, Denmark. As a nine-year-old, he moved with his family to Vollsmose, a suburb of Odense, where he began playing for B 1909. He would since play for many clubs, including B 1913, FC Wettingen, AGF, Ikast, Lyngby, AB and, most notably, Swedish club Örebro SK between 2003 and 2007.

Personal life
In Denmark he was nicknamed Dyne after Danish entrepreneur Lars Larsen.

Larsen is married to Swedish politician, Sofia Larsen, who has been member of the Riksdag since 1998.

References

External links
 

1970 births
Living people
Danish men's footballers
Denmark under-21 international footballers
Danish expatriate men's footballers
Allsvenskan players
Superettan players
Boldklubben 1909 players
Boldklubben 1913 players
Akademisk Boldklub players
Aarhus Gymnastikforening players
Ikast FS players
Lyngby Boldklub players
FC Wettingen players
Örebro SK players
Expatriate footballers in Sweden
Association football midfielders
Danish Superliga players
Danish 1st Division players
Swiss Super League players
Expatriate footballers in Switzerland
Danish expatriate sportspeople in Switzerland
Danish expatriate sportspeople in Sweden
People from Nordfyn Municipality
Denmark youth international footballers
Sportspeople from the Region of Southern Denmark